|}

The Naas Oaks Trial is a Listed flat horse race in Ireland open to three-year-old thoroughbred fillies. It is run at Naas over a distance of 1 mile and 2 furlongs (2,012 metres), and it is scheduled to take place each year in June.

The race was first run in 2012. It serves as a trial for the Irish Oaks and the most recent horse to win both races was Even So in 2020.

Records
Leading jockey (3 wins):
Pat Smullen – Caponata (2012), Carla Bianca (2014), Discipline (2016)

Leading trainer (6 wins):
 Aidan O'Brien – Venus de Milo (2013), Outstanding (2015), Key To My Heart (2017), Easter Lily (2018), Willow (2021), Galleria Borghese (2022)

Winners

See also
 Horse racing in Ireland
 List of Irish flat horse races

References
Racing Post:

Flat races in Ireland
Naas Racecourse
Flat horse races for three-year-old fillies
Recurring sporting events established in 2012
2012 establishments in Ireland